Raufoss Ammunisjonsfabrikker was a Norwegian company based at Raufoss, established in 1896 as Rødfoss Patronfabrik. Initially the company manufactured ammunition, and later also other products, such as aluminium parts to the automotive industry. Until 1948 the company was a subordinate to the Norwegian Ministry of Defence. In the 1990s the automobile division was split off as Raufoss Automotive and eventually taken over by Norsk Hydro. In 1998 the ammunition division was merged with the Swedish company Celsius and the Finnish company Patria, forming the new company Nammo.

References

Formerly government-owned companies of Norway
Defunct companies of Norway
Companies based in Oppland
Manufacturing companies established in 1896
Vestre Toten
Ammunition manufacturers
Manufacturing companies disestablished in 1998
1998 disestablishments in Norway
Norwegian companies established in 1896